The Clackamas Indians are a tribe of Native Americans of the U.S. state of Oregon who traditionally lived along the Clackamas River in the Willamette Valley. Lewis and Clark estimated their population at 1800 in 1806. At the time the tribe lived in 12 villages that occupied from the lower Columbia River to an area what is now called Oregon City. They resided towards the east side of the Willamette River given this length of land. In February 1841, Reverend François Norbert Blanchet and Reverend Alvin F. Waller converted Clackamas Chief Popoh.

In fall of 1851, a treaty was never ratified by Oregon superintendent, Anson Dart. Another treaty was signed on January 10, 1855 and was ratified March 3, 1855. The Clackamas were to be granted twenty-five hundred dollars of resources, which only a fifth was paid.

Lifestyle 
The tribe subsisted on fish and roots. The Indians would construct large platforms made from cedar in order to dip their nets in over Willamette Falls. This form of fishing was used to harvest salmon. Once the salmon were caught and brought to shore, the women of the tribe would prepare the salmon by drying or smoking the salmon. This was then combined with a mixture of berries and nuts or salmon would be preserved in woven baskets to be preserved for the winter months. The Clackamas Indians would use salmon as a form of trade amongst other tribes. Other forms of trade included wapato, a root that also known as Sagittaria.

Both men and women wore leather leggings and tunics. Cedar bark was used to make skirts and bedding. An indication of high status in the tribe was intricate beadwork, quill, feather, and shell decorations. These shells were also used as a form of currency. Like others of the Chinookan peoples, they practiced head flattening. From infancy the head was compressed between boards, thus sloping the forehead backward. This was a way to indicate that a person was free rather than a slave.

The Clackamas were expert woodworkers as they crafted canoes and plank lodges. Canoes were used to travel down rivers. A typical canoe was built to be between 20-30 feet. This feature allowed the tribe to carry more produce or people down the river. Having knowledge of the Clackamas river systems, the Clackamas people were hired by pioneers as guides to navigate the river systems.

Tomanowos 
The Willamette Meteorite is revered by the Clackamas Indians. The meteorite is called Tomanowos, which translates to "the visitor of heaven". The meteorite was believed to be given from the Sky People and is the unity between sky, earth, and water. Other tribes around the area thought that the meteorite possessed magical powers.

Descendants

By 1855, the 88 surviving members of the tribe were relocated to Grand Ronde, Oregon, first to the Grand Ronde Indian Reservation; later they blended in the general population.

Soosap was probably born in 1841, was the "last" full-blooded Indian as his mom was full-blooded Clackamas, his father Klickitat. He lived off the Grand Ronde reservation; living his days in Oregon City performing odd jobs. His given name was Joseph Andrews as people couldn't pronounce his native name. He was also a known baseball player in the Pacific Northwest.

Descendants of the Clackamas belong to the Confederated Tribes of the Grand Ronde Community of Oregon.

See also
Other Chinookans of the lower Columbia River:
Cathlamet
Multnomah

References

External links 
On the Clackamas people
more on the Clackamas people
National Geographic on the Clackamas Indians
On the Willamette Meteorite

Chinookan tribes
Native American tribes in Oregon
Indigenous peoples of the Northwest Plateau
Clackamas County, Oregon
Willamette Valley